The Crestfallen is a demo EP by the British doom metal band Anathema.

Release
It was the first official release in Anathema's discography. "They Die" was not included on the vinyl version.

In 1994, The Futurist Label included all of the tracks as part of the band's first album Serenades. The following year, Peaceville released the EP as a double CD with Serenades. In 2001, it was re-issued together with Pentecost III on one disc.

Orchestral versions of "Crestfallen", "They Die" and "Everwake" were recorded for the 2011 compilation Falling Deeper.

Track listing
All lyrics written by White (except track 4, lyrics written by D. Cavanagh), all music written by Anathema.

Credits
 Darren White — vocals
 Daniel Cavanagh — lead guitar
 Vincent Cavanagh — rhythm guitar
 John Douglas — drums
 Duncan Patterson — bass guitar

Additional personnel
 Ruth Wilson — vocals on "Everwake"

References

Anathema (band) albums
1992 debut EPs